Pope John XVI of Alexandria (Abba Youannis XVI), 103rd Pope of Alexandria & Patriarch of the See of St. Mark.

He died on 10 Paoni 1434 A.M. (15 June 1718).

17th-century Coptic Orthodox popes of Alexandria
1718 deaths
18th-century Coptic Orthodox popes of Alexandria